"Alla mia età" (English: "At My Age") is a pop song written and produced by Italian singer-songwriter Tiziano Ferro for his fourth studio album, Alla mia età, released on November 7, 2008. "Alla Mia Età" was released as the album's lead single in early October 2008.

Track listing
Digital download
"Alla mia età" – 3:33
"A mi edad" (Spanish version) – 3:33

Charts

Peak positions

References

External links
 Tiziano ferro official website
 "Alla Mia Età" Official Music video

2008 singles
Italian-language songs
Number-one singles in Italy
Tiziano Ferro songs
Pop ballads
Songs written by Tiziano Ferro
Songs written by Roberto Casalino